Season 2004–05 was a relative success for Hibernian, as the team performed well in the league, finishing third and qualifying for the UEFA Cup in Tony Mowbray's first season as manager. Hibs lost to league strugglers Dundee United in both cup competitions; 2–1 in a Scottish Cup semi-final, and 2–1 after extra time in the League Cup quarter-final. The season also saw the development of a number of promising young players, particularly strikers Derek Riordan and Garry O'Connor. This relative success came after the club had been disappointingly beaten by FK Vetra in the UEFA Intertoto Cup.

League season 
Hibs enjoyed a successful first season under new manager Tony Mowbray, as the club finished 3rd in the league and qualified for the next season's UEFA Cup competition. Hibs were pushed for third place by Aberdeen and only clinched the position on the final day of the season. The final day match was against Rangers, who needed to win to have a chance of winning the championship, while Hibs needed to avoid a heavy defeat to prevent Aberdeen overtaking them on goal difference. Rangers took a 1–0 lead after 59 minutes, and the later stages of the game were played out without either team chasing a goal as it suited their needs. Highlights of the season included wins at Tynecastle and Celtic Park, which were big steps towards finishing in such a high position.

Results

Final table

Intertoto Cup 
Despite having finished in the bottom half of the Scottish Premier League table in the previous season, Hibs volunteered to enter the Intertoto Cup. They were drawn against Lithuanian A Lyga side FK Vetra, with Hibs due to play at home first. New manager Tony Mowbray was faced with only having 12 players available for the first training session of the season, just 12 days before the first match with Vetra.

The first match, which was played in "farcical conditions after a thunderstorm flooded the Easter Road pitch", ended in a 1–1 draw. In the return match, Vetra sat back and allowed Hibs the majority of ball possession, but they were unable to create more than a few goalscoring chances from this. A goal resulting from an error by young goalkeeper Alistair Brown condemned Hibs to defeat. The Edinburgh Evening News described Hibs' participation as "a gamble" that had "backfired"; former Hibs player Stuart Lovell questioned the motives of the Hibs board, and the point of giving short term contracts to players just to play in the matches against Vetra.

Results

Scottish League Cup 
As one of the SPL clubs who had not automatically qualified for European competition, Hibs entered at the last 32 stage (second round) of the competition, in which they defeated Alloa Athletic 4–0 at Easter Road. Hibs were then given a favourable draw against Albion Rovers in the last 16. Despite the underdogs taking a shock lead, Hibs ran out 3–1 winners in a game that was played on a neutral venue (Hamilton). In the quarter-final, Hibs were drawn to play Dundee United at Tannadice. Hibs took the lead through a Derek Riordan goal in the first half and held it for most of the game, but Jim McIntyre scored a late equaliser in normal time, and then scored the winner in extra time.

Results

Scottish Cup 
Hibs reached the semi-final of the Scottish Cup, where they met Dundee United. Hibs went into the match as favourites due to the contrasting league form of the two sides; indeed, Hibs had beaten United 3–2 in the league at Easter Road the previous week. Hibs took the lead in the cup match thanks to a Derek Riordan penalty, but then collapsed to a 2–1 defeat, with the winner scored by Jason Scotland.

A curious postscript to the defeat was that Jason Scotland was denied a renewal of a UK work permit the following summer by an expert panel, which included former Hibs players Murdo MacLeod, Tony Higgins, Pat Stanton, Peter Cormack and Tommy McIntyre. The panel was hearing an appeal against a decision to reject the application to renew Scotland's work permit, which had been made automatically because Scotland had only played in two of Trinidad and Tobago's international matches in the preceding two years. The decision forced Scotland to leave United; he signed later that summer for Scottish First Division club St Johnstone, and has subsequently played in the Premier League for Wigan Athletic.

Results

Transfers

Players In

Players Out

Loans In

Loans Out

Player stats 
During the 2004–05 season, Hibs used 32 different players in competitive games. The table below shows the number of appearances and goals scored by each player.

|}

See also
List of Hibernian F.C. seasons

Notes

External links 
Fixtures & Results, Hibernian F.C. official site
Hibernian 2004/2005 results and fixtures, Soccerbase

Hibernian F.C. seasons
Hibernian